Era Baru Sdn Bhd is a Malaysian property development and investment holding company based in Seremban, Negeri Sembilan in Malaysia. The company was incorporated on 8 September 1981 under the umbrella of Grand Linage Sdn Bhd. Since its incorporation, Era Baru together with its parent company and other subsidiaries have successfully completed more than 4,000 units of residential and commercial properties within Negeri Sembilan, with total sales revenue of more than RM146 million.

Company Activities

Completed residential and industrial projects
 Taman Indah, Seremban
 Taman Bukit Markisa, Seremban
 Taman Ampangan, Seremban
 Taman Jemapoh, Kuala Pilah
 Taman Ulu Bendol, Kuala Pilah
 Taman Sri Terachi, Kuala Pilah
 Taman Sri Mawar, Senawang
 Taman Seri Pagi, Senawang
 Taman Desa Dahlia, Senawang
 Sri Senawang Light Industrial Centre, Senawang
 Bukit Sri Senawang, Sungai Gadut
 Taman Serting Utama, Jempol
 Pusat Perniagaan Jempol (Phase 1 & 2), Jempol
 Taman Awana Indah, Bahau
 Taman Tasik Bahau
 Taman Temerloh Indah (Phase 1), Temerloh, Pahang

Completed leisure and entertainment projects
 Era Square, an  integrated development project consisting of commercial, leisure, shopping and bus terminal services in Seremban 
 Era Hotel Bahau, the first 2-star hotel with dining, health care, entertainment and conference facilities in Bahau 
 Era Golf & Country Resort, the first 18-hole golf course with full facilities including a Club House in Bahau

Completed properties designed for investment
Certain properties developed by the Group are held for investment purposes such as:
 A 4-storey shopping complex with a basement car park in Seremban Town, currently rented out to The Store (Seremban) Sdn Bhd
 A 4-storey shopping complex with a basement car park in Bahau Town, currently rented out to Hi Way Cash & Carry Sdn Bhd
 A single-storey restaurant at Era Square, currently rented out to Min Kok Restaurant Sdn Bhd

Under development
 Taman Ampangan, Seremban (Final phase)
 Pusat Perniagaan Jempol Jempol (Shopping Centre & Phase 3 onwards)
 Era Square, Seremban (Phase 2 onwards)

Gallery

1981 establishments in Malaysia
Real estate companies established in 1981
Privately held companies of Malaysia
Property companies of Malaysia